Poomani is a 1996 Indian Tamil-language film, directed by Kalanjiyam and produced by G. V. Anandan. The film stars Murali, Devayani, Prakash Raj and Reshma.

Cast
Murali as Poomani
Devayani as Vijaya
Prakash Raj as Thangamani
Reshma as Pottu
Manivannan as Veerappan
Vinu Chakravarthy as Muthuramalingam
Sabitha Anand

Soundtrack
The music was composed by Ilaiyaraaja.

Reception
Geocities wrote "The main drawback of the movie is the screenplay and the direction (Mu. Kalanchiyam). While watching this movie, it is quite obvious that the director is new and that he needs more experience. [..] Also, the narration of the story is not smooth."

References

External links

 

1996 films
Indian drama films
Films scored by Ilaiyaraaja
1990s Tamil-language films
Films directed by Kalanjiyam
1996 directorial debut films